Kim Jong (also romanized Gim Jeong or Kim Jung in South Korea) may refer to:

Kim Jong, birth name of Heongang of Silla (–886)
Kim Jong (table tennis) (born 1999), North Korean Olympic athlete
Kim Jong (sports management) (born 1961), South Korean Vice Minister of Culture and Sports during the Park Tae-hwan doping scandal

See also

Kim Jong-il (1941–2011), second leader of North Korea
Kim Jong-un (born 1983), third leader of North Korea and son of Kim Jong-il

Kim (Korean surname)
Jung (Korean given name)